In telecommunications, bit inversion means the changing of the state of a bit to the opposite state, i.e. the changing of a 0 bit to 1 or of a 1 bit to 0. It also refers to the changing of a state representing a given bit to the opposite state.

Source: Federal Standard 1037C and MIL-STD-188

See also 
 Bit error

Data transmission